Luis José Esteban Rojas Zamora (born 6 March 2002), known simply as Luis Rojas, is a Chilean footballer who plays as a midfielder for Italian  club Pro Vercelli on loan from Crotone.

Club career
In September 2020, he joined Crotone in Italy.

On 31 January 2022, Rojas was loaned to Bologna in Serie A until the end of the 2021–22 season.

On 31 January 2023, Rojas was loaned to Pro Vercelli in Serie C.

Career statistics

Club

Notes

Personal life
He is the son of the Chilean former international footballer Luis Rojas Álvarez and brother of Silvio Rojas, a former footballer who represented Chile U17 at the 1993 FIFA World Championship.

References

External links
 

2002 births
Footballers from Santiago
People from Maipo Province
Living people
Chilean footballers
Chile youth international footballers
Association football midfielders
Universidad de Chile footballers
F.C. Crotone players
Bologna F.C. 1909 players
F.C. Pro Vercelli 1892 players
Chilean Primera División players
Serie A players
Serie B players
Serie C players
Chilean expatriate footballers
Expatriate footballers in Italy
Chilean expatriate sportspeople in Italy